The Senior Scout Adventure Cederberg is a biennial event for Scouts from South Africa and other countries, organised by Scouts South Africa.  The adventure takes the form of a hike of about 10 days, usually in the Cederberg mountains. During this time, participating Scouts get to visit a number of activity centres where they can participate in activities ranging from marksmanship and rock climbing to sailing and gold panning.

History
In 1968, Colin Inglis, the Western Cape Divisional Commissioner at the time, called a meeting to discuss the loss of 15- and 16-year-old Scouts, which usually happened before they achieved their 1st Class Badge. He felt that once a Scout had reached the age of 16, troop activities were no longer an adventure for them and as a result they left the movement. He suggested that an adventure activity be held for 16-year-old Scouts who had obtained their 1st Class Badge, which could be the 'cherry on top' of their Scout careers.

The meeting agreed and a small committee was set up to run an event late in 1969. This committee was composed of Colin Inglis, "Fatty" Rutter, Richard Knight, "Impie" Bryant and the Divisional Secretary. The rest of the year was spent organising the location in the Cederberg, testing communications, hiring school busses, finding activity leaders and various other functions. This first adventure was open only to Scouts from the Western Cape, but it was so successful that it was requested for subsequent events to be opened to Scouts from all over South Africa.

The team decided to rename it 'The National Senior Scout Adventure' and open it to all Scouts over 15 and 6 months of age who held the 1st Class Badge. It was decided that if the national event was a success it would be opened up to international Scouts. Due to pressure, the minimum age was lowered to 14 for Scouts who held their 1st Class Badge and were recommended by their Scouter. However, in 2004 the minimum age of 15 was reinstated.

The first national event was held over new years of 1970/1971 and was an even greater success that the experimental event and it was decided that it would be repeated every 2 years. However, this was not always possible and the next one was only held in 1974.

After the 1974 adventure the Cederberg was declared a wilderness area and activity centres were no longer allowed to be in the same location for more than 24 hours due to the new forestry rules. For this reason the 1976 adventure was moved to the Winterhoek. On this adventure a storm made rivers uncrossable and the adventure came to a stand-still for several days until the water subsided. To date, this was the only adventure where a helicopter has been used to rescue Scouts, who were trapped in a kloof by rising water. Although unexpected, this added a new dimension to the adventure.

The following three were held in the Witzenberg Valley over the new years of 1978, 1981 and 1983. These adventures went well with the 1983 adventure being the biggest with 600 Scouts.

In 1985, permission was obtained from private landowners in the Cederberg to put activity centres on their land and the Department of Forestry gave permission for Scouts to hike and camp in the wilderness area. In December 1986, the National Senior Scout Adventure moved back to the Cederberg and has remained there ever since.

Colin Inglis continued to organise adventures in 1988, 1990, 1992 and 1994, until handing over to Richard Goldschmidt for the 1996 and 1998 adventures. Buzz Macey took over as the organiser for 2000 and 2002 when the event was opened up to Guides and Girl Scouts. John Mütti was the Adventure Organiser for 2004 and 2006/7 Centenary of Scouting. Buzz Macey ran the 2008 and 2010 Adventures, and Nigel Forshaw ran the Adventure in December 2012.

External links

Scouting and Guiding in South Africa